Kalasam is a soap opera that aired Monday to Friday on Sun TV from 14 July 2008 to 26 June 2009 totaling 234 episodes.

The show starred Ramya Krishnan, Sudha Chandran, Kutty Padmini, T. S. B. K. Moulee, Devan and Saakshi Siva among others. It was produced by Vision Time and RDV Staarlight Works and directed by Senthil Kumar and A. Abdulla.  Its Creative Head was Ramya Krishnan.

Plot
The story follows an independent woman named Neelambari (Ramya Krishnan) who fights for women's rights and a rich woman named Chandramathi (Sudha Chandran) who has very high self-esteem and is full of attitude.

An air force officer named Ranjini (Ramya Krishnan) is an adopted child whose birth mother is Neelambari (Ramya Krishnan). Neelambari and Chandramathi (Sudha Chandran) were very close friends when they were young. Neelambari came from a wealthy family, and Chandramathi worked under her. However, the friendship didn't last long, out of jealousy Chandramathi betrayed Neelambari by taking away all of her assets. Neelambari's husband murdered Naalambari and ran away from the country.

Twenty-five years later, Chandramathi is shocked to see a woman who looks like Neelambari (Neelambari's daughter Ranjini). Still haunted by what she did she brought Ranjini under her control. Many of her plots fail until one-day Chandramthi's manages to get Ranjini arrested and jailed.

A lawyer reads a newspaper article about how Ranjini got arrested and, having been fond of her, Neelambari decides to help her. The story begins here and has many twists and turns, including the return of Neelambari, who after 25 years comes to take revenge on Chandramthi.

In the end, Neelambari forgives Chandramathi, and the drama ends.

Cast

Main cast

 Ramya Krishnan as Neelambari(Vasundhara) & Ranjini
 Sudha Chandran as Chandhramathi(Main Antagonist)
 Kutty Padmini as Sangeetha (school teacher)
 T. S. B. K. Moulee as Advocate Satyamoorty

Recurring cast

 Srithika as Madhumita (Neelambari's Adopted daughter)
 Devan
 Saakshi Siva as Gopi
 Sanjeev
 Kuyili as Sharadha (Ranjini's adopted mother)
 Vijaykirushnan
 Manokar as Karthi(Ranjini's brother)
 Srithar
 Kumaresan
 Vanaja
 Iswarya as Uma (Sangeetha's daughter)
 Jayalakshmi
 Vasuvi as Meena
 Rajesh
 Shanthi Williams as Nagalakshmi (Chandramathi's mother)
 Vietnam Veedu Sundaram

International broadcast
The Series was also broadcast internationally on Channel's international distribution. It airs in Sri Lanka, Singapore, Malaysia, South East Asia, Middle East, United States, Canada, Europe, Oceania, South Africa and Sub Saharan Africa on Sun TV. The show's episodes were released on Vision Time Tamil YouTube channel from 20 May 2016.

  It aired in the Indian state of Andhra Pradesh on Gemini TV Dubbed in Telugu language as Kalasam.

See also
 List of programs broadcast by Sun TV

References

External links
 Official Website 

Sun TV original programming
Tamil-language thriller television series
2008 Tamil-language television series debuts
Tamil-language television shows
2009 Tamil-language television series endings